Your World Awards 2012 is produced by Telemundo, and was broadcast live on August 30, 2012. It was hosted by Gaby Espino and Rafael Amaya. Voting for nominees started on July 25, and ended on August 17, 2012. The awards show averaged 1.68 million viewers. Due to its success, a second edition of Premios Tu Mundo was held on August 15, 2013.

Winners and nominees

Telenovela

Music

Variety

References 

Premios
Telemundo
Premios
Premios
Premios Tu Mundo
Telemundo